Ignacio Diez de la Barrera y Bastida (1645–1709) was a Roman Catholic prelate who served as Bishop of Durango (1701–1704).

Biography
Ignacio Diez de la Barrera y Bastida was born in Mexico in 1645.
On 16 November 1705, he was appointed during the papacy of Pope Clement XI as Bishop of Durango. On 30 January 1707, he was consecrated bishop. He served as Bishop of Durango until his death on 20 September 1709.

See also
Catholic Church in Mexico

References

External links and additional sources
 (for Chronology of Bishops) 
 (for Chronology of Bishops) 

1645 births
1709 deaths
Bishops appointed by Pope Clement XI
18th-century Roman Catholic bishops in Mexico